Athrypsiastis salva is a moth in the family Xyloryctidae. It was described by Edward Meyrick in 1932. It is found in China.

References

Athrypsiastis
Moths described in 1932
Moths of Asia